Emigrant Lake is a reservoir located  southeast of Ashland, Oregon, at the southern end of the Rogue Valley. 
The spillway is at the northern tip of the lake. Emigrant Creek is a tributary of Bear Creek.

History
The reservoir was created in 1924 when the original  concrete arch dam was built by the Talent Irrigation District for irrigation and flood control. 
In 1960, the United States Bureau of Reclamation enlarged the dam into the  rock-filled structure standing today.

Recreation area

Emigrant Lake features a large recreation area. This includes a 42-site, full-hookup campground,
picnic areas, and two  water slides open from Memorial Day to Labor Day.

Drought conditions and archaeological study
In October 2014, drought conditions prompted the Bureau of Reclamation to order an archaeological study to protect artifacts that have become exposed due to the lake being at less than 10 percent of capacity. During the 2020–21 North American drought, the lake reached 3% capacity.

See also
 List of lakes in Oregon

References

External links

Emigrant
Lakes of Jackson County, Oregon
Buildings and structures in Jackson County, Oregon
Protected areas of Jackson County, Oregon
Dams in Oregon
United States Bureau of Reclamation dams
Dams completed in 1924
1924 establishments in Oregon